Game 6 of the 1998 NBA Finals was a professional basketball game that was played on June 14, 1998 between the visiting Chicago Bulls and the Utah Jazz at the Delta Center, now known as Vivint Arena, in Salt Lake City, Utah. The game is widely cited as one of the most intense and iconic games in NBA history, and it is best known for Bulls superstar Michael Jordan executing a quick cross-over on Jazz forward Bryon Russell, and then hitting a jumpshot from behind the free throw line with 5.2 seconds remaining in the 4th quarter to ice the game and put the Bulls up 87-86. Chicago then held on to win after John Stockton missed a 3-point field goal,  winning their sixth NBA championship in eight years. Game 6 was the final game with the Bulls for Michael Jordan and coach Phil Jackson (both would retire from the National Basketball Association (NBA), then eventually return). This game earned, and still holds, the highest TV ratings of an NBA game of all time.

Background

Both the Utah Jazz and the Chicago Bulls finished the regular season tied for the best record in the NBA at 62–20. The Jazz defeated the Los Angeles Lakers in the Western Conference Finals, and the Bulls defeated the Indiana Pacers in the Eastern Conference Finals, setting up a rematch of the prior year's NBA Finals, which the Bulls had won in 6 games. The Jazz swept the season series against the Bulls 2–0, giving them the tiebreaker for home-court advantage throughout the NBA Playoffs.

In the finals series, the Jazz had won Game 1, while the Bulls had won Games 2–4. At the United Center in Game 5, Michael Jordan missed a game-winning 3-pointer at the buzzer, allowing the Jazz to stave off elimination with an 83–81 victory and return to Utah for Game 6, and a potential Game 7. None of the previous five Finals appearances for the Bulls had gone to a Game 7.

Game summary
Scottie Pippen scored the opening basket on a slam dunk that aggravated a back injury, causing him pain and difficulty moving throughout the game. Pippen was limited to 8 points on 4–7 shooting in 26 minutes played. Michael Jordan took 35 of the Bulls' 67 shots, leading the team in scoring and minutes played with 45 points in 44 minutes. Karl Malone led the Jazz in both categories with 31 points in 43 minutes.

In the first half of the game, while the Jazz led 28–24 with just under 10 minutes left in the second quarter, Jazz guard Howard Eisley saved a pass that almost sent the ball out of bounds. As the shot clock was running down, Jazz forward/center Antoine Carr passed the ball a long distance to Shandon Anderson, but the ball flew over Anderson's hands. Eisley caught the ball and hit a 3-pointer, but referee Dick Bavetta ruled that Eisley released the ball after the shot clock expired. Replays showed that the ball had left Eisley's hands with a second left on the shot clock  (the NBA did not use instant replay to review calls until 2002). Calling the game for NBC, Bob Costas narrated a replay of Eisley's shot: "See if the ball isn't out of his hand. One second...it's on the way, and they missed the call." Jazz head coach Jerry Sloan opted not to argue the call because it may risk a second technical foul which could lead to ejection. In the second half, Bulls guard Ron Harper made a jump shot as the shot clock went off that tied it at 79; at the NBC play-by-play, Costas announced that Harper released the ball on time, but commentator Isiah Thomas, narrating a replay of Harper's shot, considered it to be "a tough call."

Although the Jazz held a 49–45 lead at halftime and a 66–61 at the end of the 3rd quarter, they let them slip away in the fourth. John Stockton hit a 3-pointer with 41.9 seconds left to give the Jazz an 86–83 lead. Michael Jordan scored a layup on the following possession to cut the lead to one. With 18.9 seconds left and the Jazz in possession, Jordan stole the ball from Karl Malone in the low post and dribbled down the court. Bryon Russell guarded Jordan as time wound down. Jordan drove inside the 3-point line, and executed a quick cross-over.  Jordan then hit a 20-footer to give the Bulls an 87–86 lead with 5.2 seconds left. Neil Funk made the call for the Bulls' radio network.

Bob Costas, calling the game on television for NBC, had this call.

Then as the replays of Jordan's shot were being shown, Costas added.

Utah called timeout to set up the final play of the game. John Stockton took the inbound pass, and missed a game-winning 3-pointer that would've sent the series to a Game 7, and the Bulls celebrated. It was mentioned by Costas that Ron Harper may have blocked the ball with his fingertips. Antoine Carr was open during the shot, but the rebound went just out of his reach. The game was Jordan's final shot as a Bulls player and his 25th game-winning shot for Chicago.

Box score

Broadcasting
In the United States, the NBC television network broadcast the game and all other 1998 NBA Finals games live under the NBA on NBC series. The game registered a 22.3 Nielsen rating and 38 share with average 35.9 million viewers - the highest rated and most watched game in the history of the NBA, 72 million people in the US watched at least part of the game. The previous record was a 21.2 rating and 37 share for Game 7 of the 1988 NBA Finals between the Los Angeles Lakers and Detroit Pistons.

Legacy
Michael Jordan's game-winner to put the Bulls up 87–86 with 5.2 seconds left is remembered as one of the greatest plays in NBA history. In 2010, John Hollinger of ESPN ranked Jordan's last shot as a Bulls player fourth among 50 best single-game performances. The shot was recreated for the 2006 television ad "Second Generation".

The officiating of this game continued to be discussed decades later. In 2008, Tim Buckley of the Deseret News (a daily newspaper published in Salt Lake City) wrote in a profile of Jazz coach Jerry Sloan that the calls involving Howard Eisley and Ron Harper "to this day continue to be discussed and debated by disgruntled Jazz faithful." AskMen.com ranked the no-call on Michael Jordan's last shot of this game sixth on a top-ten list of bad referee calls. Bryon Russell remarked in 2009: "Whether he pushed off or not, he was making that shot."

In 2009, Jordan mentioned Russell in his Hall of Fame induction speech, recalling an interaction they had during Jordan's first retirement in 1994: "[A]t this time, I had no thoughts of coming back and playing the game of basketball. Bryon Russell came over to me and said, 'Why did you quit? You know I could guard you.' ... From this day forward, if I ever see [Russell] in shorts, I'm coming at him." In response, Russell challenged Jordan to a game of one-on-one for charity. Such a match-up has not yet taken place, though the Utah Flash of the NBA Development League did stage a halftime game between Russell and a Jordan look-alike. The Flash offered refunds to fans who expected Jordan actually to appear.

After Michael Jordan retired, interest in the NBA declined, especially after the 1998–99 NBA lockout. Commenting on how the 1999 NBA Finals had the lowest TV ratings for a Finals series since 1981, Eric Boehlert wrote in Salon.com: "Viewers stayed away because the season had been shortened; Michael Jordan had just retired; the Spurs and the Knicks faced each other in the Finals." Game 5 of the 2000 NBA Finals had only half as many viewers as Game 6 of the 1998 NBA Finals. However, Game 5 of the 2001 Finals, when the Los Angeles Lakers won their second consecutive championship under former Bulls coach Phil Jackson, had the highest ratings of a championship-winning game on the network since Game 6 of the 1998 Finals. NBC's broadcast rights to NBA games expired after the 2002 NBA Finals, when the Lakers won their third consecutive championship under former Bulls coach Phil Jackson. The 2003 NBA Finals had even worse ratings (9.8 million), and only 11.5 million watched the 2005 Finals; the San Antonio Spurs won both years.

References

External links
 

National Basketball Association playoff games
National Basketball Association Finals
1997–98 NBA season
June 1998 sports events in the United States
1998 in sports in Utah
Basketball competitions in Salt Lake City
Michael Jordan
Chicago Bulls games
Utah Jazz games